Blofield is a village and civil parish in the Broadland district of Norfolk, England. The parish includes Blofield and the hamlets of Blofield Heath and Blofield Corner and, according to the 2001 census, had a population of 3,221, increasing to 3,316 at the 2011 Census. Since construction of a bypass in 1982, the A47 no longer passes through the village.

History 
Mentioned in the Domesday Book as Blafelda and Blauuefelde, Blofield has a long history. There are a number of theories regarding the origins of its name, which may derive from the Anglo-Saxon for blue Blech or Bleo, blossom Bloo or  blow Blowan, along with the word for field Feld. The oldest building in the village is the Parish Church of St Andrew and St Peter, built sometime between 1420 and 1444, and largely replacing an earlier Norman structure. Large in size, it reflects the prosperity of the wool trade over this period.

Blofield today 
Village amenities include the recently re-opened and refurbished Kings Head public house, Blofield County Primary School, a doctors surgery, a library, scout hut, newsagent, post office/convenience store, fish and chip shop, florist, hairdresser, an outdoor leisure and camping store, a farm shop and a solicitor's office. Sporting and social facilities are also provided by  The Margaret Harker Hall and Blofield Court House constitute the meeting place for a number of village groups, such as the Women's Institute (which was formed in 1918, and claims to be the oldest in Norfolk), Guides, badminton club, slimming groups and playgroup for children of pre-school age.  The Court House also hosts regular film shows showing recent releases usually on the first or second Friday of every month. During the day it is served by the hourly 15 bus to Norwich operated by First Norfolk & Suffolk; there is no service in the evenings or on Sundays. The nearest railway station is about a mile away, in the village of Brundall. Blofield Heath has one Indian restaurant, The Tamarind, and a post office/convenience store. Heathlands Community Centre is a focal point for social activities and the village also has a primary school, Hemblington County Primary. A pre-school playgroup also operates from Heathlands.

Sport
Blofield has a tennis Club founded in 1924 with 4 grass courts and 1 hard court open to members.

Blofield has two Non-League football clubs:
 Norwich United F.C. who play at Plantation Park, just outside the village centre but within the parish 
 Blofield United F.C. who play in the Anglian Combination Premier Division, their home ground at the Margaret Harker Hall playing field in the centre of the village.

Notable people 
Sir Arthur Borton - Governor of Malta 1878-1884 was born in Blofield in 1814.
Darren Eadie - former football player who played for Norwich City and Leicester City.
John Edrich - England Test cricketer from 1963 to 1976, was born in Blofield in 1937.
Ken Brown - Norwich City manager from 1980 to 1987.

War Memorial
Both World Wars had an enormous impact on Blofield, which is remembered by a stone Celtic cross located in St. Andrew's and St. Peter's Churchyard. It bears the following names for the First World War:
 Lieutenant Reginald E. Blyth (d.1916), HMS Barham
 Leading-Seaman Arthur J. Ward (1888-1918), HMS Nicator
 Leading-Seaman Robert J. Payne (1897-1918), HMS Racoon
 Leading-Stoker Arthur J. Smith (1876-1916), HMS Invincible
 Corporal William Brown (1880-1917), 1st Battalion, Royal Norfolk Regiment
 Lance-Corporal James W. Jaggs (d.1918), 9th Battalion, Royal Fusiliers
 Lance-Corporal Benjamin Marshall (d.1918), 1/4th Battalion, York and Lancaster Regiment
 Private William Hanton (d.1917), 11th Battalion, Cheshire Regiment
 Private Harry Gostling (1893-1916), 4th Battalion, East Yorkshire Regiment
 Private Herbert C. Waterton (d.1916), 12th Battalion, East Yorkshire Regiment
 Private Bernard H. Limpus (1876-1917), 24th Battalion, Royal Fusiliers
 Private Alec R. East (1895-1917), 1st Battalion, Royal Norfolk Regiment
 Private William G. Green (1898-1917), 1st Battalion, Royal Norfolk Regiment
 Private Frederick W. Symonds (1892-1916), 1st Battalion, Royal Norfolk Regiment
 Private Charles H. J. Marler (1885-1917), 7th Battalion, Royal Norfolk Regiment
 Private Benjamin Newstead (1886-1916), 7th Battalion, Royal Norfolk Regiment
 Private Reginald Gunns (1891-1916), 8th Battalion, Royal Norfolk Regiment
 Private Thomas B. Farman (d.1915), 9th Battalion, Royal Norfolk Regiment
 Private William R. Gowen (1891-1917), 9th Battalion, Royal Norfolk Regiment
 Private Herbert G. Houghton (1895-1918), 9th Battalion, Royal Norfolk Regiment
 Private Ernest A. Ling (1898-1918), 9th Battalion, Royal Norfolk Regiment
 Private Albert Newstead (1893-1918), 9th Battalion, Royal Norfolk Regiment
 Private Samuel J. Shreeve (1890-1916), 9th Battalion, Royal Norfolk Regiment
 Private Russel J. Symonds (d.1915), 9th Battalion, Royal Norfolk Regiment
 Private George W. Burdett (d.1916), 2nd Battalion, Royal Sussex Regiment
 Rifleman Ernest L. Lynes (1895-1915), 7th Battalion, King's Royal Rifle Corps
 Rifleman Alfred J. Simmons (d.1918), 2nd Battalion, Rifle Brigade (The Prince Consort's Own)
 Sapper Walter F. Foulger (1884-1917), 130th (Field) Company, Royal Engineers
 Philip S. Barber
 Percy H. Hall
 A. Nelson Rose
 William Turner

And, the following for the Second World War:
 Lance-Corporal Matthew Hanton (1903-1942), 6th Battalion, Royal Norfolk Regiment
 Able-Seaman Ronald C. A. Marshall (1919-1940), HMS Ivanhoe
 Leading-Aircraftman E. R. John Spooner (1922-1942), Royal Air Force
 Guardsman Benjamin D. Barber (1920-1940), 1st Battalion, Coldstream Guards
 Private Stanley C. Trett (1920-1942), 6th Battalion, Royal Norfolk Regiment
 Richard Beck
 Reggie Bussey

See also
 Blofeld
 Blomfield (disambiguation)
 Bloomfield (disambiguation)

References

External links

Villages in Norfolk
Civil parishes in Norfolk
Broadland